Sangidorjiin Adilbish (born 20 December 1954) is a Mongolian sports shooter. He competed at the 1976 Summer Olympics, the 1980 Summer Olympics and the 1988 Summer Olympics.

References

External links

1954 births
Living people
Mongolian male sport shooters
Olympic shooters of Mongolia
Shooters at the 1976 Summer Olympics
Shooters at the 1980 Summer Olympics
Shooters at the 1988 Summer Olympics
Place of birth missing (living people)
Asian Games medalists in shooting
Shooters at the 1982 Asian Games
Asian Games gold medalists for Mongolia
Medalists at the 1982 Asian Games
20th-century Mongolian people